__notoc__
MSMC may refer to:
 Any of a number of educational institutions named Mount St. Mary's
 Mount Sinai Medical Center, in Chicago
  Mount Sinai Medical Center, in Miami
 Mount Scopus Memorial College, a private school located in Melbourne, Victoria, Australia
 Modern Sub Machine Carbine, an Indian submachine gun